Lambley is an English village and civil parish near Nottingham, England, hardly touched by urbanisation, as it lies in a green belt. The population recorded in the 2011 census was 1,247. Its proximity to Nottingham has tended to raise the price of its real estate.

Governance and environment
Lambley comes under the Lambley Parish Council and Gedling Borough Council.

Lambley Dumbles are secluded places noted for their geology and ancient woodland rich in flowers and ferns. They are accessed along three marked village trails.

Wicketwood Hill was a wood in medieval times south of Lambley village, then a hamlet on the downhill part of Spring Lane. Newer maps show it as a wider residential area west of Wood Farm.

Heritage

Toponymy
The name Lambley contains the Old English words lamb and lēah meaning a forest, wood, glade, clearing and later pasture. The name means "lamb's meadow".

History
Flint tools found in fields near Lambley point to Neolithic and Bronze Age settlement. It is mentioned in Domesday Book (1086) as Lambeleia.

The parish church of Holy Trinity is a Grade I listed building. It has been designated "one of the few entirely Perpendicular village churches in Notts, all of a piece and of felicitous proportions tall and narrow, all the windows high and spacious." The only earlier section is part of the west tower (12th–13th centuries). Rebuilding was financed by Ralph, Lord Cromwell (see under Notable people).

Nine men born in Lambley are reported to have died in action in the First World War.

Notable people
In order of birth:
Ralph de Cromwell, 3rd Baron Cromwell (c. 1393–1456), Lord Treasurer of England to Henry VI responsible for submitting the first budget to Parliament, was born in the village and funded the building of much of the church.
John de Crumbewell (fl. 14th c.), parson of Lambley, was given a pardon for outlawry in 1360.
Eric Martin (1925–2015), first-class cricketer for Nottinghamshire, was born in the village.
David Glenn (living), plantsman and gardener, has named his Australian garden "Lambley" after his childhood home.
Mark Spencer (born 1970), elected a Conservative MP for Sherwood in 2010, attended Lambley Primary School.

Transport
The nearest railway station is Lowdham, on the Lincoln–Newark–Nottingham line.

There are occasional bus links with Nottingham, Arnold, Netherfield and nearby villages.

The A6097 and A612 trunk roads pass through Lowdham.

Education
After year six, most pupils at Lambley Primary School transfer for secondary education to Colonel Frank Seely Academy in Calverton. The most recent Ofsted report for Lambley Primary, in January 2014, rated it Good for pupil achievement, teaching quality, pupil behaviour and safety, and leadership and management. It had 109 pupils aged 4–11 at the time. The school has a website.

Amenities
Businesses in Lambley include a general store and others dealing with the motor trade, skiing equipment, bars and catering, accountancy, architecture, horticultural nursery, boarding kennels and caravan storage. There are two pubs: the Woodlark Inn and the Robin Hood Inn.

A crematorium, the fourth in Nottinghamshire, opened in 2017.

References

External links

Lambley Village Website

Villages in Nottinghamshire
Civil parishes in Nottinghamshire
Gedling